The Tripolina is a folding chair made out of wood with metal swivel joints and animal hide. It was invented by Joseph B. Fenby and patented in the United States in 1881.

The Tripolina chair was made from prior to World War II by the firm of Viganò in Tripoli, Libya, for the expatriate Italian market as a camping chair of great stability in the sand and made from local wood and camel or cow hide. The Italian firm of Viganò clearly stamped their products on the rear of the hides with their large "Paolo Viganò Tripoli" oval seal. The hide is nowadays often replaced by canvas or other materials.

Further inspirations
The chair has inspired other folding chairs, the famous BKF Chair for instance, also known as Butterfly chair. It uses curved metal instead of wood for the structure and the leather is made up of four separate pieces.

Manufacturers
Tripolina chairs are still produced to this day in various countries.

References

Chairs
Individual models of furniture
Portable furniture